The 2005–06 Turkish Second League Category A (also known as Iddaa League A due to sponsoring reasons) was the second-level football league of Turkey and the 43rd season since its establishment in 1963–64. At the end of the season, in which 18 teams competed in a single group, Bursaspor and Antalyaspor, which finished the league in the first two places, and the play-off winner Sakaryaspor were promoted to the upper league, while Mersin İdman Yurdu, Yozgatspor and Çanakkale Dardanelspor, which were in the last three places, were relegated.

Final standings

Results

Promotion play-offs

Promotion play-offs were organized in 19 Mayıs Stadium in Ankara between May 20 and May 24

Top goalscorers

References 

 

TFF First League seasons
Turkey
1